Sarah Rector, also known as Sarah Rector Campbell and Sarah Campbell Crawford, (March 3, 1902 – July 22, 1967) was an American oil magnate who was known as the "Richest Colored Girl in the World".

Early life and family
Sarah Rector was born in 1902 near the all-black town of Taft, located in the eastern portion of Oklahoma, in what was then Indian Territory. She had five siblings. Rector's parents, Rose McQueen and her husband, Joseph Rector (both born 1881), were the Black grandchildren of Creek Indians before the Civil War, and were descendants of the Muscogee Creek Nation after the Treaty of 1866. As such, they and their descendants were listed as freedmen on the Dawes Rolls, by which they were entitled to land allotments under the Treaty of 1866 made by the United States with the Five Civilized Tribes.

Sarah's father Joseph was the son of John Rector, a Creek Freedman. John Rector's father, Benjamin McQueen, was enslaved by Reilly Grayson, who was a Creek Indian. John Rector's mother Mollie McQueen was the Muscogee Opothleyahola, who fought in the Seminole Wars and split with the tribe, moving his followers to Kansas. Sarah Rector was allotted . This was a mandatory step in the process of integration of the Indian Territory with Oklahoma Territory to form what is now the State of Oklahoma.

Oil strike and wealth
The parcel allotted to Sarah Rector was located in Glenpool,  from where she and her family lived. It was considered inferior infertile soil, not suitable for farming, with better land being reserved for white settlers and members of the tribe. The family lived simply but not in poverty; however, the $30 annual property tax on Sarah's parcel was such a burden that her father petitioned the Muskogee County Court to sell the land. His petition was denied because of certain restrictions placed on the land, so he was required to continue paying the taxes.

To help cover this expense, in February 1911, Joseph Rector leased Sarah's parcel to the Standard Oil Company. Rector began to receive a daily income of $300 from this strike. The law at the time required full-blooded Indians, black adults, and children who were citizens of Indian Territory with significant property and money, to be assigned "well-respected" white guardians. Thus, as soon as Rector began to receive this windfall, there was pressure to change Rector's guardianship from her parents to a local white resident named T.J. (or J.T.) Porter, an individual known to the family. Rector's allotment subsequently became part of the Cushing-Drumright Oil Field. In October 1913, Rector received royalties of $11,567.

As news of Rector's wealth spread worldwide, she began to receive requests for loans, money gifts, and marriage proposals, despite the fact that she was only 12 years old. Given her wealth, in 1913, the Oklahoma Legislature made an effort to have her declared white, allowing Rector to reap the benefits of her elevated social standing, such as riding in a first-class car on the trains.

In 1914, an African American journal, The Chicago Defender, began to take an interest in Rector, just as rumors began to fly that she was a white immigrant who was being kept in poverty. The newspaper published an article claiming that her estate was being mismanaged by the white guardians of the estate.  This caused National African American leaders Booker T. Washington and W. E. B. Du Bois to become concerned about her welfare. In June of that year, a special agent for the National Association for the Advancement of Colored People (NAACP), James C. Waters Jr., sent a memo to Du Bois regarding her situation. Waters had been corresponding with the Bureau of Indian Affairs and the United States Children's Bureau over concerns regarding the mismanagement of Rector's estate. He wrote of her white financial guardian:

Is it not possible to have her cared for in a decent manner and by people of her own race, instead of by a member of a race which would deny her and her kind the treatment accorded a good yard dog?

This prompted Du Bois to establish the Children's Department of the NAACP, which would investigate claims of white guardians who were suspected of depriving black children of their land and wealth. Washington also intervened to help the Rector family. In October of that year, she was enrolled in the Children's School, a boarding school at the Tuskegee Institute in Alabama, headed by Washington. Upon graduation, she attended the Institute.

Rector was already a millionaire by the time she had turned 18 in 1920. She owned stocks, bonds, a boarding house, businesses, and a  piece of prime river bottomland. At that point, she left Tuskegee and, with her entire family, moved to Kansas City, Missouri. She purchased a house on 12th Street, known as the Rector House, which is currently owned by a local nonprofit, with the intention of restoration and historical and cultural preservation.

Soon after moving to Kansas City, when she was 17 or 18, she married local businessman Kenneth Campbell in 1920. The wedding was a very private affair with only her mother and Campbell's paternal grandmother present. The couple had three sons before divorcing in 1930. In 1934, she married restaurant owner William Crawford.

Later life
Rector lived a comfortable life and, with a taste for fine clothing and cars, enjoyed her wealth. She threw lavish parties and entertained celebrities such as Count Basie and Duke Ellington.

Rector died on July 22, 1967, at the age of 65. She is interred in Blackjack Cemetery in her childhood hometown of Taft.

See also
 Honorary whites

References

Bibliography

Further reading
 

1902 births
1967 deaths
Creek freedmen
People from Muskogee County, Oklahoma
People of Indian Territory
American socialites
American businesspeople in the oil industry
Tuskegee University alumni
African-American people
Burials in Oklahoma
Muscogee (Creek) Nation people
20th-century Native Americans
African-American women in business
American women in business
Wealth in the United States
Race in the United States